Cernach mac Fogartaig (died 738) was a king in southern Brega of the Uí Chernaig sept of Lagore of the Síl nÁedo Sláine branch of the southern Ui Neill. He was the son of the high king Fogartach mac Néill (died 724). He appears as a leader of the Uí Chernaig in the years 737-738.

The Uí Chernaig sept had a feud with the Uí Chonaing sept of Cnogba (Knowth) in North Brega going back to the assassination of Cernach's grandfather Niall mac Cernaig Sotal (died 701) by Írgalach mac Conaing (died 702).

Cernach seems to have had a bad reputation and the Annals of Ulster record in 738 at his death:Cernach, son of Fogartach, is treacherously killed by his own criminal adherents, and the calves of the cows and the women of this lower world for long bewailed him.

Notes

See also
 Kings of Brega

References

 Annals of Ulster at CELT: Corpus of Electronic Texts at University College Cork
 Annals of Tigernach at CELT: Corpus of Electronic Texts at University College Cork
 Charles-Edwards, T. M. (2000), Early Christian Ireland, Cambridge: Cambridge University Press,

External links
CELT: Corpus of Electronic Texts at University College Cork

Kings of Brega
738 deaths
8th-century Irish monarchs
Year of birth unknown